Bø Sommarland is one of Europe's biggest water parks, situated in Bø in Telemark, Norway. Bø Sommarland is located two hours from Oslo. It is owned by Parques Reunidos, who also owns Tusenfryd, another amusement park in Norway. Every summer around 200,000 people visit Bø Sommarland, which makes the park one of Norway's biggest tourist attractions. 
The park opening season is normally from beginning of June to the middle of August.

History
Bø Sommarland opened on 27 June 1985 as Telemark Sommarland. It was local forces that developed the park in the "Middle of nowhere".

Attractions in the park

Jettegryta (2006)

Jettegryta, "Pothole", is one of the biggest slides in Bø Summerland. Two and two are sitting in a boat starting at high speed through a tube before they enter an open pan. Slide is over 100 meters long and has a fall of more than 16 meters.

Half pipe (2004)

The Half pipe is one of Europe's biggest half pipes in water with a height difference of 19 meters.

Flow Rider (1994)

Flow Rider is the world's largest artificial surf wave. The artificial surf wave is related to Summerland river where it every hour a wave is released.

Mot i Brøstet (1997)

Mot i Brøstet was the world first roller coaster in water when it was built in 1997. Today it is Europe's biggest water roller coaster.

Magasuget (1986)

Magasuget is a ride that starts 26 meters over the ground with freefall of 9 meters.

Leikeland

Leikeland is the playground for children. You will find climbing castles, electric cars, fairytale houses, slides, jumping castles, mini golf and other dry attraction for children.

Videos
Rekordforsøk med Andreas Wahl
Tacky Summer Invitational 2011
TV-reklame

References 

 Kleppen, Halvor. 2005. Våte, Ville Sommarland.

External links
Bø Sommarland
Attractions

Amusement parks in Norway
1985 establishments in Norway
Parques Reunidos
Amusement parks opened in 1985